Multitone Records, originally Savera Investments, was a British record label founded by Pran Gohil in 1978. Pran was formerly Regional Head of Polygram, Asia Pacific based in the Netherlands and also Executive Chairman of Spartan Records, London. Multitone Records specialized in bhangra style music. The style itself was commercialized by Multitone Records, which is considered to be the pioneer of British Bhangra and the label grew to become the "largest Asian record label in the world" during its lifetime under Managing Director Jitesh Gohil. In 1992, the company entered into a joint venture with BMG in order to spread its label throughout Europe and internationally. Multitone's artists formed the "who's who" of the British bhangra scene including The Safri Boyz, DCS, XLNC, Sasha, Amar, Apna Sangeet, Alaap, Chirag Pehchan and many more. A number of Multitone's records entered the UK and International charts  including "People of the world" by Sasha, "Take me higher" by Bindushri and "Tu hai mera sanam" by Amar. Multitone's music also entered the market on the Indian subcontinent with hits like "Patel rap" by Bali, and hits of Abba in Hindi by Salma and Sabina Agha.The company began distribution in the United States on 27 June 1994 through M.S. Distributing Co. Paul Bernard was appointed as the US representative of the company. The US debut featured albums by Pammi and XLNC

.

Following the buyout of BMG by Sony Music in 2008, the label became one of the subsidiaries of Sony Music Entertainment UK Holdings Ltd. where it was listed "dormant"

Multi tone Records was acquired by Moviebox Records International Birmingham who revamped the collection and launched the Bhangra Legends collections and also gave birth to the Legends Band.

.

Labeled bands
 Alaap
 Azaad
 Apna Sangeet
 Premi Group
 Achanak
 DCS
 Pammis
 Sahotas (signed in 1988)
 XLNC
 Chirag Pehchan

See also
Bhangra (music)
List of bhangra bands
BMG
List of Record Labels

References

Bhangra (music)
Defunct record labels of the United Kingdom